This is a list of events that took place in 2015 related to British television.

Events

January

February

March

April

May

June

July

August

September

October

November

December

Most watched television of this year
The entire series of Call the Midwife was successful in the ratings this year, with all eight episodes from its fourth series reaching the Top 20 most watched programmes watched in 2015. Successful drama broadcasts on BBC One continued with EastEnders Live Week surrounding the Who Killed Lucy Beale? storyline. The Voice UK also enjoyed its most successful series ever, with the first six episodes reaching the Top 50.

Top 50 most-watched television broadcasts

Notes

Debuts

BBC

ITV

Channel 4

Channel 5

Other channels

Channels

New channels

Defunct channels

Rebranding channels

Television shows

Changes of network affiliation

Returning this year after a break of one year or longer

Continuing television shows

1920s

1930s

1950s

1960s

1970s

1980s

1990s

2000s

2010s

Ending this year

Deaths

See also
 2015 in British music
 2015 in British radio
 2015 in the United Kingdom
 List of British films of 2015

References